Edmond Berenger (16 December 1905 – 18 April 1993) was a French racing cyclist. He rode in the 1933 Tour de France.

References

1905 births
1993 deaths
French male cyclists
Place of birth missing